FC Baden is a Swiss football club based in Baden, Canton Aargau, which is a short distance from Zürich. It was founded in 1897. FC Baden has a total of 22 different teams at age levels, including five women's teams. They play in the Swiss Promotion League, the third tier of Swiss football.

History

In the 1985–86 season, the club participated in the Swiss Super League but were relegated after finishing last, coming 16th out of 16. After that time the club was in the Swiss Challenge League where they stayed until relegation in the 2005–06 season. Since that time the club have been in the third tier of the Swiss football pyramid. They narrowly lost out on promotion back to the Challenge League at the end of the 2007–08 season. Over the past few years, due to financial problems, the club have had to rely on young players, as well as loans from local Super League side FC Aarau, with whom they have a very good relationship.

Current squad
As of 29 August 2022.

Stadium
FC Baden play their home games at the Esp Stadium in Fislisbach which is a few miles outside of Baden. The capacity of the stadium is 7,000, of which 1,000 is seating and the rest is terracing.

Notable former players

References

External links
 football.ch profile 
 Soccerway profile 

 
Football clubs in Switzerland
Association football clubs established in 1897
Baden, Switzerland
1897 establishments in Switzerland